Mimi Kajiru Shinuchi (耳噛じる 真打) is an EP by Japanese nu metal/hardcore punk band Maximum the Hormone, released on 18 November 2015. It was first made available as part of the set for the band's third video release Deka Vs. Deka.   It consists of re-recordings from their 2002 EP Mimi Kajiru. The band's 2017 live comeback tour was titled after the EP. 

This is Maximum the Hormone's last release with VAP, as the band would sign with Warner Music Japan in September 2018.

Track listing

Personnel
 Daisuke – lead and backing vocals
 Maximum the Ryo – guitar, lead and backing vocals
 Ue-chan – bass guitar, backing vocals
 Nao – drums , backing and lead vocals

References

2015 EPs
Maximum the Hormone albums
Japanese-language EPs